Art Martinich is a former American soccer player who earned caps with the United States men's national soccer team in 1973.

Martinich's first game with the national team came in a 1–0 loss to Poland on August 3, 1973.  He was subbed out for Richard Green at halftime.  Two days later, he played every minute of a 1–0 win over Canada.  His third, and last, game was five days after that when the U.S. lost 4–0 to Poland.

References

Year of birth missing (living people)
Living people
American soccer players
United States men's international soccer players
Association football defenders